Marie-Clara Dorimène Roy Desjardins (September 17, 1858 - June 14, 1932) and her husband Alphonse Desjardins were co-founders of the Caisses populaires Desjardins (today Desjardins Group), a forerunner of North American credit unions. She was appointed honorary member of the Union régionale des caisses populaires Desjardins de Québec in 1923.

References

1858 births
1932 deaths
Businesspeople from Quebec
Canadian cooperative organizers
French Quebecers
People from Lévis, Quebec
Canadian women in business
Canadian company founders
Canadian women company founders
Canadian bankers
Persons of National Historic Significance (Canada)